Mattoax is an unincorporated community located on the Appomattox River in Amelia County, in the U.S. state of Virginia. The area used to have a train station and post office along the former Richmond & Danville Railroad. However, the station has since been demolished.

References

Unincorporated communities in Virginia
Unincorporated communities in Amelia County, Virginia